Diaphania is a genus of moths of the family Crambidae.

Species

Diaphania adelalis (Dognin, 1905)
Diaphania albianalis (Hampson, 1918)
Diaphania albicincta (Hampson, 1899)
Diaphania albifascialis (Hampson, 1912)
Diaphania andringitralis Viette, 1960
Diaphania antillia Munroe, 1960
Diaphania argealis (Walker, 1859)
Diaphania arguta (Lederer, 1863)
Diaphania aroalis (Schaus, 1920)
Diaphania atomosalis (Dognin, 1908)
Diaphania attigua (E. Hering, 1906)
Diaphania auricollis (Snellen, 1875)
Diaphania aurogrisealis (Hampson, 1912)
Diaphania beckeri Clavijo & Munroe, 1996
Diaphania brevilinealis (Schaus, 1920)
Diaphania brunneacollis (Schaus, 1920)
Diaphania busccalis (Schaus, 1920)
Diaphania cachinalis (Strand, 1920)
Diaphania circumfumata (Dognin, 1905)
Diaphania clavata (Hampson, 1912)
Diaphania columbiana (Hampson, 1899)
Diaphania contactalis (Dognin, 1903)
Diaphania costaricalis (Schaus, 1912)
Diaphania costata (Fabricius, 1775)
Diaphania culminalis (Schaus, 1924)
Diaphania damalis (Druce, 1895)
Diaphania dohrni (Hampson, 1899)
Diaphania elegans (Möschler, 1890)
Diaphania equicincta (Hampson, 1912)
Diaphania esmeralda (Hampson, 1899)
Diaphania eumeusalis (Walker, 1859)
Diaphania euryzonalis (Hampson, 1912)
Diaphania exclusalis (Walker, 1865)
Diaphania fenestralis Amsel, 1956
Diaphania flavicaput (Hampson, 1899)
Diaphania fuligalis (Schaus, 1912)
Diaphania fumosalis (Guenée, 1854)
Diaphania fuscicaudalis (Möschler, 1881)
Diaphania fuscicollis (Snellen, 1875)
Diaphania gilvidorsis (E. Hering, 1906)
Diaphania glauculalis (Guenée, 1854)
Diaphania grisealis (Maassen, 1890)
Diaphania guatemalalis (Schaus, 1920)
Diaphania guenealis (Snellen, 1875)
Diaphania hemicitralis (Hampson, 1912)
Diaphania holophaealis Hampson, 1900
Diaphania holophoenica (Hampson, 1912)
Diaphania hyalinata Linnaeus, 1767
Diaphania hypheusalis (Walker, 1859)
Diaphania immaculalis (Guenée, 1854)
Diaphania impunctalis (Dognin, 1905)
Diaphania indica (Saunders, 1851)
Diaphania infernalis (Möschler, 1890)
Diaphania infimalis (Guenée, 1854)
Diaphania innotata (Druce, 1895)
Diaphania interpositalis (Hampson, 1912)
Diaphania latilimbalis (Guenée, 1854)
Diaphania limitalis (Dognin, 1905)
Diaphania lualis (Herrich-Schäffer, 1871)
Diaphania lucidalis (Hübner, 1823)
Diaphania magdalenae (Hampson, 1899)
Diaphania marinata (Fabricius, 1784)
Diaphania meridialis Yamanaka, 1972
Diaphania mirabilis (Druce, 1902)
Diaphania monothyralis (Hampson, 1918)
Diaphania morosalis (Schaus, 1920)
Diaphania negatalis (Walker, 1859)
Diaphania nigricilialis (Schaus, 1912)
Diaphania nitidalis (Stoll in Cramer & Stoll, 1781)
Diaphania novicialis (Schaus, 1912)
Diaphania ochrivitralis (Hampson, 1899)
Diaphania oeditornalis (Hampson, 1912)
Diaphania olealis (C. Felder, R. Felder & Rogenhofer, 1875)
Diaphania oleosalis (Snellen, 1875)
Diaphania oriolalis Viette, 1958
Diaphania orthozonalis (Hampson, 1912)
Diaphania phlebitis (Hampson, 1912)
Diaphania plumbidorsalis (Guenée, 1854)
Diaphania praxialis (Druce, 1895)
Diaphania punctilinealis (Hampson, 1918)
Diaphania purpurea (Hampson, 1912)
Diaphania pyloalis (Hampson, 1859)
Diaphania reductalis (Guenée, 1854)
Diaphania sahlkei (E. Hering, 1906)
Diaphania satanalis (Snellen, 1875)
Diaphania semaphoralis (Dognin, 1903)
Diaphania spurcalis (Snellen, 1875)
Diaphania subterminalis (Hampson, 1912)
Diaphania subtilalis Amsel, 1956
Diaphania superalis (Guenée, 1854)
Diaphania taenialis (Dognin, 1905)
Diaphania terminalis (Maassen, 1890)
Diaphania translucidalis (Guenée, 1854)
Diaphania yurakyana Vila, Piñas & Clavijo, 2004

Former species
Diaphania eurytornalis (Hampson, 1912)
Diaphania modialis (Dyar, 1912)
Diaphania niveocilia (Hampson, 1899)

References

  (2004). Zootaxa 539: 1-8.
 Clave pictórica de las especies de Diaphania Hübner, 1818 (Lepidoptera: Crambidae) de Venezuela

 
Spilomelinae
Crambidae genera
Taxa named by Jacob Hübner